Roshnai Gate is one of the thirteen gates within the Walled City of Lahore in Lahore, Punjab, Pakistan. It was the main entry into Lahore for emperors and nobles during the Mughal, and later Sikh period. 

Its extended height and width is testament to its use by emperors' caravans of elephants. Since the Ravi river once flowed alongside the northern wall of the Lahore Fort and the Badshahi Mosque, the gate was profusely illuminated during night to aid travelers. It is for this reason that the gate has been named as “Roshnai Darwaza” or the “gate of light”. It is considered to be the oldest of Lahore's gates, and is only gate that has been preserved in its original shape.

Gallery

See also 
 Lahore
 Lahore Fort
 Walled City of Lahore
 Badshahi Mosque

References

External links 

 Walled City Has thirteen gates

Gates of Lahore